Varik is a village in the Dutch province of Gelderland. It is a part of the municipality of West Betuwe, and lies about 8 km south of Tiel.

Varik was a separate municipality until 1978, when it became a part of Neerijnen.

History 
It was first mentioned between 968 and 971 as Feldrike. The etymology is unclear. Varik developed along the Waal River as a stretched out esdorp The tower of the Dutch Reformed Church dates from the 15th century and received its spire in 1844. The church building dates from 1881. The Roman Catholic church was constructed between 1877 and 1879. In 1840, Varik was home to 749 people. The grist mill De Bol was built 1867, and nowadays serves as a residential house.

Born in Varik

Gallery

References

Populated places in Gelderland
Former municipalities of Gelderland
West Betuwe